Brave most commonly refers to:
Brave, an adjective for one who possesses courage
Braves (Native Americans), an Euro-American stereotype for Native American warriors

Brave(s) or The Brave(s) may also refer to:

Film and television
 Brave (1994 film), a concept film based on the Marillion album
 The Brave (film), a 1997 film starring Johnny Depp
 Brave, a 2007 Thai film featuring Afdlin Shauki
 Brave (2012 film), a computer-animated film produced by Pixar and released by Disney
 Brave (2014 film), a Nigerian short film
  Brave: Gunjō Senki, a 2021 live-action film adaptation of manga Gunjō Senki
 The Brave (TV series), an American television series
 "Brave" (The Walking Dead: World Beyond), an episode of The Walking Dead: World Beyond
 "Brave" (Jurassic World Camp Cretaceous), an episode of Jurassic World Camp Cretaceous

Literature
 Brave (graphic novel), a 2017 children's book by Svetlana Chmakova 
 Brave (McGowan book), a 2018 memoir by Rose McGowan
 The Brave, a 2010 novel by Nicholas Evans
 The Brave, a novel by Gregory Mcdonald and the basis for the 1997 film

Music

Labels
 Brave Entertainment, a South Korean record label

Groups
 The Brave (band), an Australian metalcore band

Albums
 Brave (Beau Dermott album) or its title song
 Brave (Joyryde album)
 Brave (Jennifer Lopez album) or its title song
 Brave (Jamie O'Neal album) or its title song
 Brave (Kate Ceberano album) or its title song
 Brave (Shawn McDonald album)
 Brave (Marillion album) or its title song
 Brave (Nichole Nordeman album) or its title song
 Brave (Moriah Peters album) or its title song
 Brave (The Shires album) or its title song
 Brave (soundtrack), a soundtrack album from the 2012 film

Songs
 "Brave" (Arashi song)
 "Brave" (Sara Bareilles song)
 "Brave" (Ella Henderson song)
 "Brave" (Josh Groban song)
 "Brave" (Kelis song)
 "Brave" (Idina Menzel song)
 "Brave", a song by Action Item
 "The Brave", a song by The Ghost Inside from Fury and the Fallen Ones
 "Brave", a song by Katatonia from Brave Murder Day
 "Brave", a song by Leona Lewis from Echo

Places
 Brave, Pennsylvania, United States, an unincorporated community and census-designated place
 Brave Mountain, Labrador, Canada

Ships
 , various Royal Navy ships
 Brave-class patrol boat, comprising two motor torpedo boats of the Royal Navy Coastal Forces division
 French ship Brave, various French Navy ships
 HMS Arab (1798), a post ship originally the French privateer Brave

Sports teams

American and Canadian football
 Burlington Braves, a junior football league team based in Ontario, Canada
 Syracuse Braves, an American professional football team in 1936 and 1937
 Boston Braves (NFL), the original name in 1932 of the National Football League team that became the Redskins

Baseball
 Atlanta Braves, an American Major League Baseball team (originally the Boston Braves, then the Milwaukee Braves), or their affiliates:
 Anderson Braves, a former affiliate
 Austin Braves, a former affiliate of the Milwaukee and Atlanta Braves
 Danville Braves, a farm team
 Dominican Summer League Braves
 Evansville Braves, minor league team affiliated with the Boston and Milwaukee Braves in the 1940s and 1950s
 Greenwood Braves, a former affiliate
 Gulf Coast League Braves
 Gwinnett Braves, a Triple-A affiliate previously the Richmond Braves (see below)
 Jacksonville Braves, a former Class A affiliate of the Milwaukee Braves
 Kingsport Braves, a former affiliate
 Macon Braves, a Class A affiliate now the Rome Braves (see below)
 Mississippi Braves, in Class AA
 Richmond Braves, a defunct Triple-A affiliate
 Rome Braves, in Class A
 Savannah Braves, a former affiliate
 Sumter Braves, a former affiliate
 Utica Braves, a former affiliate of the Boston Braves and other teams
 Ventura Braves, a former affiliate of the Boston Braves
 Waycross Braves, a former affiliate of the Milwaukee Braves
 Wichita Braves, a former Class AAA affiliate of the Milwaukee Braves
 Bourne Braves, a collegiate summer baseball team in Massachusetts
 Kilgore Braves, an East Texas League baseball team in 1936
 Orix BlueWave, formerly the Hankyu Braves and Orix Braves, a defunct Japanese professional baseball team
 Salisbury Braves, a defunct affiliate of the Houston Colt .45s in 1961 and the New York Mets in 1962
 Staunton Braves, a collegiate summer baseball team in Virginia

Basketball
 Bendigo Braves, in the Australian Basketball Association
 Buffalo Braves, a National Basketball Association team now the Los Angeles Clippers
 Elizabeth Braves, a 1940s American Basketball League team

Ice hockey
 Boston Braves (AHL), a former American Hockey League team
 Brockville Braves, a Junior "A" hockey team from Ontario, Canada
 Saanich Braves, a Junior "B" hockey team in British Columbia, Canada
 Spokane Braves, a Junior "B" hockey team in Washington state
 St. Louis Braves, a former affiliate of the National Hockey League Chicago Black Hawks 
 Tavistock Braves, a Junior "C" hockey team from Ontario
 Valleyfield Braves (2014–), a Junior "AAA" hockey team from Quebec, Canada
 Valleyfield Braves (defunct), a former Junior "AAA" hockey team from Quebec, Canada

University teams
 Braves, the athletics teams of the University of North Carolina at Pembroke
 Bradley Braves, the athletics teams of Bradley University, Illinois
 Ottawa Braves, the athletics teams of Ottawa University, Kansas

Other sports teams
 Boston Braves (rugby league), an American National Rugby League team
 Braves (Super Fours), a women's cricket team that competed in the Super Fours
 Indianapolis Braves, an American soccer team
 Kitchener-Waterloo Braves, a Junior "A" box lacrosse team from Ontario, Canada

Video games
 Brave (video game), a game based on the 2012 film
 Brave: A Warrior's Tale, a 2009 port of the 2005 platform game for Xbox 360 and Wii
 Brave: Shaman's Challenge, a 2009 puzzle game for Nintendo DS
 Brave: The Search for Spirit Dancer, a 2005 platform game for PlayStation 2
 Temple Run: Brave, a 2012 endless runner for iOS, Android, and Windows Phones

Other uses
 Brave (magazine), an American fashion magazine
 Brave (web browser), a free and open-source web browser based on Chromium
 Brave Search, search engine
 Brave series (勇者シリーズ), a robot toy and anime franchise
 Kansu Braves, an army division of Chinese Muslims from Kansu that fought in the Boxer Rebellion
 Ysabella Brave (born 1979), American YouTube personality and singer

See also
 List of people known as the Brave